Nathan Davis is an American lawyer and former ice hockey coach and center who was an All-American for Miami.

Career
Davis spent two years with the USNTDP, playing alongside future NHL players like Phil Kessel, Jack Skille and Jack Johnson. After winning a silver medal at the 2004 World U18 Championships, Davis began attending Miami University. He proved to be a solid addition to the team in his freshman season, finishing 1 off of the team lead with 14 goals. He was selected by the Chicago Blackhawks in the 4th round of the 2005 Draft. He responded by leading the RedHawks in scoring as a sophomore and leading the team to just the second 1st-place finish in program history. During the season, Davis was a member of the United States national junior team. They finished a disappointing 4th for the 2006 World Junior Championships.

Davis was named an alternate captain for his junior season and continued to lead the team in scoring. He was named an All-American for the year and led the program to its first ever NCAA Tournament victory, scoring the first goal in a 2–1 win. After the season, Davis played for the US national team but went scoreless in seven games. He returned to Miami for his senior year but things couldn't have started worse. He injured his shoulder in the season opener and missed several games. The team was able to persevere without their star center and ended up post the best record in program history. Davis would eventually rejoin the team, playing in half of their games, and led Miami into the postseason with the 2nd overall seed. In the first game of the tournament, Davis reinjured his shoulder and he was unable to participate in the quarterfinal game against Boston College. Miami ended up losing the match 3–4 in overtime.

After graduating cum laude with a degree in political science, Davis signed with the Blackhawks and was assigned to the Rockford IceHogs. After playing just over half of the team's games in 2009, he was limited to just 23 appearances in his second season. Rather than continue fighting through the injury that never fully healed, Davis retired from professional hockey.

He returned to Ohio and worked as an intern for Senator Sherrod Brown. He had another brief stint as a sales representative for the Wirtz Beverage Group, operated by the owners of the Chicago Blackhawks. He tried yet a third career, this time as an account executive with Evolve Vacation Rental Network in Denver, Colorado. In 2013 he decided to go back to school and earn a J. D. He attended the University of Colorado Law School for three years, graduating in 2016. While there he served as a legal intern for NBCUniversal and also joined the school's club team as a coach. After passing the bar, Davis joined the Holland & Hart law firm as an associate. He remains with the LLP as of 2021.

Career statistics

Regular season and playoffs

International

Awards and honors

References

External links

1986 births
Living people
AHCA Division I men's ice hockey All-Americans
American men's ice hockey centers
Ice hockey people from Ohio
People from Rocky River, Ohio
Miami RedHawks men's ice hockey players
Rockford IceHogs (AHL) players
Chicago Blackhawks draft picks